The Supreme Court Case Selections Act of 1988 (codified at ) is an act of Congress  that eliminated appeals as of right from state court decisions to the Supreme Court of the United States. After the Act took effect, in most cases, the only avenue by which a litigant could obtain review of most lower court decisions was through the writ of certiorari, which was granted at the discretion of the Supreme Court, rather than available to the litigant as a matter of right.

The Act amended 28 U.S.C. § 1257 to eliminate the right of appeal to the Supreme Court from certain state-court judgments. Prior to the enactment of the Act, if the highest state court had found either a federal statute or treaty to be invalid or a state statute not to be invalid in the face of federal law, the party that had not prevailed had had the right to appeal to the U.S. Supreme Court. After the enactment of the Act, the only appeal as of right to the Supreme Court that still exists, pursuant to 28 U.S.C. § 1253, are cases appealing "an interlocutory or permanent injunction in any civil action, suit or proceeding required by any Act of Congress to be heard and determined by a district court of three judges."

Textual changes
Prior to the enactment of the Act, § 1257 read as follows:

The Act removed subsections (1) and (2), which had provided for the right of appeal, struck "appeal" from the section catchline, and reorganized the remaining text:

See also
 Judiciary Act of 1925

References

External links
 |TOM:/bss/d100query.html Pub. L. 100-352 information, thomas.gov
  from the Legal Information Institute at Cornell University

1988 in law
1988 in the United States
History of the Supreme Court of the United States
100th United States Congress
United States federal judiciary legislation